The following is a list of state visits made by Branko Crvenkovski during his tenure as president of Macedonia from 2004 to 2009.

References

State visits by Macedonian leaders
Politics of North Macedonia
North Macedonia politics-related lists